Hugh Stowell Scott (9 May 1862 – 19 November 1903) was an English novelist who wrote as Henry Seton Merriman. His best known novel, The Sowers went through thirty UK editions.

Life
Born in Newcastle upon Tyne, he became an underwriter at Lloyd's of London, but then took to travel and writing novels, many of which had great popularity. Scott visited India as a tourist in 1877–1878 and set his novel Flotsam (1896) there. He was an enthusiastic traveller, many of his journeys being made with his friend and fellow author Stanley J. Weyman.

Scott married Ethel Frances Hall (1865–1943) on 19 June 1889. They had no children. Scott was unusually modest and retiring in character. He died of appendicitis in 1903, aged 41, at Melton, Suffolk. Scott left £5000 in his will to Evelyn Beatrice Hall, his sister-in-law and a fellow writer, best known for a biographical work, The Friends of Voltaire. Scott explained the legacy as a "token of my gratitude for her continued assistance and literary advice, without which I should never have been able to have made a living by my pen."

He worked with great care, and his best books held a high place in Victorian fiction. His book The Sowers was made into a silent film in 1916.

Novels
His first novel, Young Mistley was published anonymously in 1888. His other novels include The Phantom Future (his only novel set entirely in England, 1888), Suspense (1890), The Slave of the Lamp (1892), From One Generation to Another (1892), With Edged Tools (a bestseller in 1894), The Sowers (generally considered his best, set in Russia, where it was banned) (1896), In Kedar's Tents (1897), Roden's Corner (1898), Dross (1899), Grey Lady; Isle of Unrest (1900), The Velvet Glove; The Vultures (1902), Queen; Barlasch of the Guard (1903) and The Last Hope (1904).

Bibliography

References

External links

For short accounts of many of the novels see the Preface on 

1903 deaths
1862 births
Writers from Newcastle upon Tyne
People educated at Loretto School, Musselburgh
Deaths from appendicitis
English male novelists
19th-century English novelists
19th-century English male writers